Mario Facco (23 January 1946 – 31 August 2018) was an Italian professional football coach and player.

Honours
 Serie A champion: 1965/66, 1973/74.
 Coppa delle Alpi winner: 1971.

1946 births
2018 deaths
Italian footballers
Italy under-21 international footballers
Serie A players
Serie B players
Inter Milan players
S.S. Lazio players
U.S. Avellino 1912 players
Parma Calcio 1913 players
Italian football managers
Frosinone Calcio managers
U.S. Salernitana 1919 managers
Ternana Calcio managers
Benevento Calcio managers
Association football defenders
Footballers from Milan